Khin Maung Soe was the Minister for Electric Power from 2011 to 2016. He was appointed in February 2011 by President Thein Sein. He was previously Chairman of the Rangoon City Electric Power Supply Board.

References

Government ministers of Myanmar
Living people
Year of birth missing (living people)